Hedysarum zundukii is a species of flowering plant in the family Fabaceae, native to Irkutsk Oblast in Russia. A cushion-former, it is found only on the western shore of Lake Baikal.

References

Hedysareae
Endemic flora of Russia
Flora of Irkutsk Oblast
Plants described in 1972